Estelle Mountain is a  peak, the tallest in the Temescal Mountains.  It is located on the west side of the upper part of the range overlooking the Temescal Valley, in Riverside County, California.

Estelle Mountain is drained on its north slopes by Dawson Canyon Wash and by ten other unnamed canyons all tributary to Temescal Creek on its west, south and east facing slopes.

References

External links 
 

Mountains of Riverside County, California
Temescal Mountains
Mountains of Southern California